The 56th General Assembly of Prince Edward Island was in session from March 18, 1983, to March 25, 1986. The Progressive Conservative Party led by James Lee formed the government.

Marion Reid was elected speaker, the first woman chosen to perform that function in the province's assembly.

There were four sessions of the 56th General Assembly:

Members

Kings

Prince

Queens

Notes:

References
 Election results for the Prince Edward Island Legislative Assembly, 1982-09-27
 O'Handley, Kathryn Canadian Parliamentary Guide, 1994 

Terms of the General Assembly of Prince Edward Island
1983 establishments in Prince Edward Island
1986 disestablishments in Prince Edward Island